Domingos José Paciência Oliveira, known simply as Domingos as a player (born 2 January 1969), is a Portuguese former footballer who played as a striker, currently a manager.

He achieved success with both Porto and the Portugal national team, appearing in more than 350 official matches with the former over 12 seasons (nearly 150 goals) and representing the latter at Euro 1996.

After completing his accreditation in 2005, Domingos resumed his career as a manager, notably helping Braga reach the 2011 Europa League final.

Playing career
A FC Porto trainee since he was 13, Domingos was born in Leça da Palmeira, Matosinhos, and proved to be a terrific goalscorer despite being physically weak. Tomislav Ivić eventually decided he should be the replacement for an ageing Fernando Gomes, and made his debut with the first team at age 19, being crowned top scorer in the Primeira Liga in the 1995–96 season. Previously, in 1990–91, he was involved in a last-matchday battle for the Bola de Prata award with S.L. Benfica's Rui Águas, with Águas' team having won the championship the game before: Domingos played first, putting four past Vitória de Guimarães in a 5–0 home win, going from 20 to 24 goals. Águas appeared hours later against S.C. Beira-Mar, and scored two second-half goals in an eventual 3–0 victory, finishing with 25.

For 1997–98, Domingos moved to the Canary Islands' CD Tenerife, one year after Porto signed prolific striker Mário Jardel. There, he teamed up with Roy Makaay, but never fully adapted to La Liga, netting only once in his final season – which ended in relegation– in a 1–2 home loss to Deportivo Alavés.

Domingos eventually returned to Porto two years later, who outbid Sporting CP at the eleventh hour. While cherished by the crowd, he did not impose himself as in the past, and retired at the end of the 2000–01 campaign. He won seven league titles, five cups and four supercups.

With Portugal, Domingos scored nine goals in 34 appearances, including one against Croatia at UEFA Euro 1996 as the national team reached the quarter-finals.

Coaching career

Leiria and Académica
After his retirement, Paciência was assigned to coach Porto's youth teams, and later the reserves. After completing his level three managing course, he was hired as manager of U.D. Leiria for 2006–07. He also opened a football school in Matosinhos, with former Porto teammate Rui Barros.

Despite a good work overall, leading the team to a seventh-place finish in the top flight, Paciência left the club before the end of the season after having fallen out with its president and also player Adriano Rossato. The following campaign, he took the reins of fellow league side Académica de Coimbra after Manuel Machado resigned.

In his first two years in charge of the Students, Paciência led them to two consecutive league wins at Benfica (3–0, 1–0). In his second season, he coached the team to a final seventh position, the best in 24 years.

Braga
In June 2009, Paciência resigned after receiving an offer from S.C. Braga which had just lost manager Jorge Jesus to Benfica. In his first season, despite a bad start which included being knocked out of the UEFA Europa League in the third qualifying round by IF Elfsborg, he guided the Minho side as they led the league for most of the campaign and eventually secured the second position – a best ever, behind Benfica – and subsequent qualification to the UEFA Champions League; the team became only the fifth in the country to reach the competition's group stage, after ousting Celtic (4–2 on aggregate) and Sevilla FC (5–3) in the qualifying rounds.

After a bad start to both the domestic and the Champions League campaigns, Braga slowly recovered their form, finishing in fourth position in the former and in third in the latter, thus qualifying to the Europa League where Paciência led the team to the final, after disposing of Lech Poznań, Liverpool, FC Dynamo Kyiv and Benfica; as he had announced in May 2011, he left his post after the game against Porto.

Sporting CP
On 23 May 2011, Paciência was named José Couceiro's successor at Sporting. His move to Lisbon was largely expected following the election of Luís Godinho Lopes as club president.

In the first season, Paciência qualified the Lions to their first Portuguese Cup final in four years. On 13 February 2012, however, as the team ranked fourth in the league, 16 points behind leaders Benfica, he was fired following a 2–0 away loss against C.S. Marítimo.

Deportivo
On 30 December 2012, Paciência signed a contract with Spanish top division club Deportivo de La Coruña, as the Galicians struggled at the bottom of the table. In his first game in charge his team beat Málaga CF 1–0 at home, marking their first win in over two months.

Paciência resigned at Depor on 10 February 2013, after not being able to help the side improve from the 20th and last position in the charts.

Kayserispor
On 17 January 2014, Paciência was named as the new manager of Kayserispor, succeeding Robert Prosinečki. His debut occurred nine days later, in a 0–3 Süper Lig loss at Sivasspor.

After a poor run of results, which saw the club record only one win in seven matches, Paciência was sacked on 17 March 2014.

Vitória Setúbal
On 22 May 2014, Paciência returned to Portugal to take over Vitória F.C. as a replacement for Couceiro. He was relieved of his duties on 19 January of the following year.

APOEL
On 21 May 2015, Paciência agreed terms with reigning Cypriot champions APOEL FC, replacing Thorsten Fink who was fired on 11 May at the conclusion of the season. After only three months in charge, the club terminated his contract following the team's failure to reach the group stage of the UEFA Champions League after being eliminated by FC Astana, as well as defeat in the Cypriot Super Cup to AEL Limassol.

Belenenses
Paciência was appointed at C.F. Os Belenenses on 20 April 2017, signing until June 2018 and eventually leading the team to the 14th position in the top flight. In January of that year, however, he left by mutual agreement and replaced by former club player Silas.

Personal life
Paciência's son, Gonçalo, is also a footballer and a forward. He too was groomed at Porto.

Career statistics

Club

International goals

Managerial statistics

Honours

Player

Club
Porto
Primeira Liga: 1987–88, 1989–90, 1991–92, 1992–93, 1994–95, 1995–96, 1996–97
Taça de Portugal: 1987–88, 1990–91, 1993–94, 1999–2000, 2000–01
Supertaça Cândido de Oliveira: 1991, 1994, 1996, 1999

Individual
Portuguese Footballer of the Year: 1990
Portuguese Golden Ball: 1990
Primeira Liga top scorer: 1995–96

Manager
UEFA Europa League runner-up: 2010–11

See also
List of association football families

References

External links

1969 births
Living people
Sportspeople from Matosinhos
Portuguese footballers
Association football forwards
Primeira Liga players
FC Porto players
La Liga players
CD Tenerife players
Portugal youth international footballers
Portugal under-21 international footballers
Portugal international footballers
UEFA Euro 1996 players
Portuguese expatriate footballers
Expatriate footballers in Spain
Portuguese expatriate sportspeople in Spain
Portuguese football managers
Primeira Liga managers
FC Porto B managers
U.D. Leiria managers
Associação Académica de Coimbra – O.A.F. managers
S.C. Braga managers
Sporting CP managers
Vitória F.C. managers
C.F. Os Belenenses managers
La Liga managers
Deportivo de La Coruña managers
Süper Lig managers
Kayserispor managers
Cypriot First Division managers
APOEL FC managers
Portuguese expatriate football managers
Expatriate football managers in Spain
Expatriate football managers in Turkey
Expatriate football managers in Cyprus
Portuguese expatriate sportspeople in Turkey
Portuguese expatriate sportspeople in Cyprus